The Singing Bridge (also known as the St. Clair Street bridge) is a two-lane vehicle and pedestrian bridge in Frankfort, Kentucky that is so named because of the humming sound it makes when driven over. , the bridge carries over 5,000 vehicles per day across the Kentucky River along St. Clair Street to Bridge Street, joining Downtown Frankfort with South Frankfort. It is a contributing structure to the Frankfort Commercial Historic District on the National Register of Historic Places.

The bridge gets its name from the humming noise it makes as vehicles travel across its open-grate steel deck, which replaced a solid flooring in 1937.

History
The over-400 foot long bridge is a Pennsylvania truss bridge built in 1893 by King Bridge Company, and was rehabilitated in 1956 and in 2010. The bridge originally carried U.S. Route 60 (US 60) until that highway was rerouted over the nearby War Mothers Memorial Bridge.

In 2019, the 125 year old bridge's load rating was reduced from 9 tons (1988) to 3 tons, then it was closed to vehicle traffic in late 2020 when an accident caused damage to a truss and rail. Repairs were started in March 2021 to repair the damage and to inspect for further damage caused when an unmoored floating marina's roof hit the bottom of the bridge on March 3, 2021 during high river levels.

Gallery

See also

 Odd Fellows Temple: also a contributing building to the historic district
 National Register of Historic Places listings in Franklin County, Kentucky

References

External links
Photos at King Bridge Manufacturing Company
Photos and technical detail at BridgeHunter.com
Technical detail at HistoricBridges.org

Road bridges on the National Register of Historic Places in Kentucky
U.S. Route 60
Bridges of the United States Numbered Highway System
Bridges over the Kentucky River
Pennsylvania truss bridges in the United States
National Register of Historic Places in Frankfort, Kentucky
Transportation in Franklin County, Kentucky
1893 establishments in Kentucky
Bridges completed in 1893
Historic district contributing properties in Kentucky